Murray Street Historic District is a national historic district located at Mount Morris in Livingston County, New York. The districts consists of the 16 properties on Murray Street between Eagle Street and Stanley Street.  The district includes 16 contributing primary buildings, all residences; six contributing outbuildings, carriage houses and garages; and three contributing objects, a carriage step, hitching post, and early 20th century street lights.

It was listed on the National Register of Historic Places in 1996.

References

Historic districts on the National Register of Historic Places in New York (state)
Historic districts in Livingston County, New York
National Register of Historic Places in Livingston County, New York